Sheen Kach Dam is small dam in Frontier Region Tank of FATA, Pakistan.

Construction of project started in 2012, and was completed in December 2014 with a projected cost of PKR 189.230 Million.

See also
 List of dams and reservoirs in Pakistan

References

Dams in Pakistan
Buildings and structures in Khyber Pakhtunkhwa
Earth-filled dams
Dams completed in 2014
2014 establishments in Pakistan
Dams in Khyber Pakhtunkhwa